The 2021–22 Martyr's Memorial A-Division League (Nepali: शहीद स्मारक ए डिभिजन लिग २०७८), also known as the Qatar Airways Martyr's Memorial A-Division League for sponsorship reasons, was the 44th edition of the Martyr's Memorial A-Division League  since its establishment in 1954/55. A total of 14 teams competed in the league.

Machhindra F.C. were the defending champions. Due to time constraints, instead of the league winner, Machhindra F.C., the top team after matchday 7,  will represent the league in the 2022 AFC Cup Preliminary Round 1.

The league was scheduled to begin on 19 September 2021 but was pushed back to begin on 15 November 2021 after multiple participating clubs' demand to postpone the league start due to the ongoing COVID-19 pandemic in Nepal. It was finally scheduled to be played from 19 November and matches were to be only played on weekends as opposed to matches being played throughout the week as was the case during the previous seasons.

On 16 February 2022, after matchday 11, Machhindra F.C. were crowned as league winners for the second consecutive time.

Teams 
A total of 14 teams, all based in the Kathmandu Valley, contested the league with a relegation system. Thirteen teams from the 2019–20 season and one team promoted from the B-Division participated in the league. Satdobato Youth Club, who debuted in the A-Division league, replaced Saraswoti Youth Club who were relegated after five seasons in the league. Prior to the season, Nepal Army Club reverted their name back to Tribhuvan Army F.C., a name that the team had used until the 2010 season.

Location

Personnel and kits

Foreign players 
All Nepal Football Association has allowed a maximum of four foreign players including one from SAARC-affiliated country per team. For the first time one of the  departmental teams, APF Club signed foreign players.

Venues
The league was scheduled to be played centrally in two venues in two cities in the Kathmandu Valley. Initially, ANFA Complex was chosen to be the third venue in the Valley. Selected matches of Manang Marsyangdi Club were held in Pokhara to honour the club's origins, making it the first season with matches outside of the Kathmandu Valley. From matchday 13 onwards, ANFA Complex was reintroduced as a venue.

League table 
<onlyinclude>

Results

Positions by round

Season statistics

Scoring

Top goalscorers 
As of 26 February 2022

Hat-tricks

Clean sheets

Awards

End-of-season awards

Broadcast rights
Selected matches were broadcast live on Kantipur Television.

All matches were also streamed live on Eleven Sports.

Notes

References 

Martyr's Memorial A-Division League seasons
Nepal
M
2021 Martyr's Memorial A-Division League, 2021